Centrocerum is a genus of beetles in the family Cerambycidae, containing the following species:

 Centrocerum divisum Martins & Monné, 1975
 Centrocerum elegans Chevrolat, 1861
 Centrocerum exornatum (Newman, 1841)
 Centrocerum hirsuticeps Bosq, 1952
 Centrocerum richteri Bruch, 1911

References

Elaphidiini
Cerambycidae genera